Montsalvy Abbey is a former Benedictine monastery located in Montsalvy, in the French departement of Cantal. It is now the Roman Catholic parish church of the village.

History

The original complex of buildings was built in the 11th century, according to Saint Gausbert's wishes. The monastery stood to the south of the church, around the current "place du cloître" (cloister) which was closed by the chapter house and a dwelling towards the east. The refectory is still standing and located south of the former cloister. What remains currently of the dwelling is only the presbytery.

The dependencies were registered in the "titre des monuments historiques" (the regional level of importance for objects or buildings in France) in 1942. The church, the chapter house, and the refectory were classified as "monuments historiques" in 1982 (national level of importance for objects or buildings).

Description

The former abbey church is a building of Romanesque style including a nave, two aisles, a transept, and three apse chapels. The outside aspect of the building was redesigned during the 17th century.

The other surviving buildings on the site include a chapter room that accommodates a permanent exhibition of valuable liturgical objects and a wooden medieval statue of Jesus Christ.

References

Bibliography 

 Montsalvy. Une cité de la Châtaigneraie cantalienne, Pierre François Aleil-Montarnal, Raymonde Gaston Crantelle, 2005.

Former Christian monasteries in France
Benedictine monasteries in France
Monuments historiques of Auvergne-Rhône-Alpes
Buildings and structures in Cantal